"The Maid Freed from the Gallows" is one of many titles of a centuries-old folk song about a condemned maiden pleading for someone to buy her freedom from the executioner. In the collection of ballads compiled by Francis James Child in the late 19th century, it is indexed as Child Ballad number 95; 11 variants, some fragmentary, are indexed as 95A to 95K. The Roud Folk Song Index identifies it as number 144.

The ballad exists in a number of folkloric variants, from many different countries, and has been remade in a variety of formats. For example, it was recorded in 1939 as "The Gallis Pole" by folk singer Huddie "Lead Belly" Ledbetter, and in 1970 as "Gallows Pole", an arrangement of the Fred Gerlach version, by English rock band Led Zeppelin, on the album Led Zeppelin III.

Synopsis
There are many versions, all of which recount a similar story. A maiden (a young unmarried woman) or man is about to be hanged (in many variants, for unknown reasons) pleads with the hangman, or judge, to wait for the arrival of someone who may bribe him. Typically, the first person (or people) to arrive, who may include the condemned person's parent or sibling, has brought nothing and often has come to see them hanged. The last person to arrive, often their true love, has brought the gold, silver, or some other valuable to save them. Although the traditional versions do not resolve the fate of the condemned one way or the other, it may be presumed that the bribe would succeed. Depending on the version, the condemned may curse all those who failed them.

The typical refrain is:

It has been suggested that the reference to "gold" may not mean actual gold for a bribe, but may instead stand for the symbolic restoration of condemned person's honor, perhaps by proving their innocence, honesty, or fidelity, or the maiden's virginity. Such an interpretation would explain why a number of the song's variations have the condemned person asking whether the visitors have brought gold or paid the fee. In at least one version the reply is: "I haven't brought you gold / But I have paid your fee."

The song is also known as "The Prickly Bush", or "The Prickilie Bush", a title derived from the oft-used refrain lamenting the maiden's situation by likening it to being caught in a briery bush, which prickles her heart. In versions carrying this theme, the typical refrain may add:

Melody 
The following is one version of the melody and lyrics, as collected by Reed Smith in McDowell County, West Virginia in 1902, and published in 1925:

Variants and collected versions 
Lucy Broadwood published a version of the song in her influential book "English Country songs" (1893). In the early 1900s, Cecil Sharp collected many versions throughout England, from Yorkshire to Somerset, and his notes and transcriptions are available via the Vaughan Williams Memorial Library website.

Field recordings 

Many audio recordings have been made by folk song collectors of traditional versions of the song. The English version of the song tends to be called "The Prickle Holly Bush", several recordings of which were made around the middle of the twentieth century, particularly in the south of England. Folklorist Peter Kennedy recorded Walter Lucas of Sixpenny Handley, Dorset singing a version in 1951, and Sarah Ann Tuck of nearby Chideok singing a similar version the following year. Bob Copper recorded Fred Hewett of Mapledurwell, Hampshire, singing a version in 1955. The song seems far less prevalent in Ireland and Scotland.

Several American versions have been recorded, particularly in the Appalachian region, where English folk songs had been preserved. Frank Proffitt of Pick Britches, North Carolina was recorded by W. Amos Abrams in c. 1939. Jean Ritchie of Viper, Kentucky sang a traditional version learnt from family members, which was recorded by Alan Lomax (1949) and Kenneth Goldstein (1961) and released on the album "The Best of Jean Ritchie" (1961) with a mountain dulcimer accompaniment. Sarah Organ Gunning, another Kentuckian, sang a similar version to collector Mark Wilson in 1974. An unusual version sung by Mrs. Lena Bare Turbyfill was collected by Herbert Halpert in 1939.

Lyrics 
Francis James Child found the English language version "defective and distorted", in that, in most cases, the narrative rationale had been lost and only the ransoming sequence remained. Numerous European variants explain the reason for the ransom: the heroine has been captured by pirates.  Of the texts he prints, one (95F) had "degenerated" into a children's game, while others had survived as part of a Northern English cante-fable, The Golden Ball (or Key).

The most extensive version is not a song at all, but a fairy story titled "The Golden Ball", collected by Joseph Jacobs in More English Fairy Tales. The story focuses on the exploits of the fiancé who must recover a golden ball in order to save his love from the noose. The incident resembles The Story of the Youth Who Went Forth to Learn What Fear Was.  Other fairy tales in the English language, telling the story more fully, always retell some variant on the heroine's being hanged for losing an object of gold.

"Gallows Pole" and commercial recordings

Lead Belly version
Folksinger Huddie "Lead Belly" Ledbetter, who also popularized such songs as "Cotton Fields" and "Midnight Special", first recorded "The Gallis Pole" in the 1930s. His haunting, shrill tenor delivers the lyrical counterpoint, and his story is punctuated with spoken-word, as he "interrupts his song to discourse on its theme".

Country blues trio Koerner, Ray & Glover covered the Lead Belly version on their 1963 debut album Blues, Rags and Hollers, under the title "Hangman."

John Jacob Niles versions
Folk singer John Jacob Niles recorded the song at least twice: On March 25, 1940 as "The Maid freed from the Gallows", re-issued on the compilation album "My Precarious Life in the Public Domain", then in April 1960 in a more dramatic version as "The Hangman" on his album "The Ballads of John Jacob Niles".

Odetta version
Folksinger Odetta released the song under the title "The Gallows Pole" on her third album At the Gate of Horn in 1957 and on her live album Odetta at Carnegie Hall which was recorded on April 8, 1960.

Judy Collins and Bob Dylan versions
Judy Collins performed the song "Anathea" throughout 1963 (including a rendition at the 1963 Newport Folk Festival), credited to Neil Roth and Lydia Wood. It is thematically similar to the Hungarian "Feher Anna", even to the detail of the name of the brother (Lazlo). It appeared on her third album, Judy Collins 3, released in early 1964.

Bob Dylan recorded a thematically similar "Seven Curses" in 1963, during the sessions for his The Times They Are A-Changin' album. The song tells a similar story, but from the point of view of the condemned's daughter. Here, it is not the maiden who is to be hanged but her father, for stealing a stallion.  The woman offers to buy her father's freedom from the judge, who responds:  "Gold will never free your father/ the price my dear is you, instead".  The maiden pays the judge's terrible price but wakes the next morning to find that her father has been hanged, anyway.

Derry Gaol/The Streets of Derry
An Irish version of the song, entitled "Derry Gaol" or "The Streets of Derry", has the young man marching through the streets of Derry "more like a commanding officer / Than a man to die upon the gallows tree". As he mounts the gallows, his true love comes riding, bearing a pardon from the Queen (or the King). It was first recorded by County Armagh singer Sarah Makem on The Folk Songs of Britain, Vol. 7: Fair Game and Foul (1961), and subsequently by Shirley Collins, Trees, The Bothy Band, Cara Dillon, Andy Irvine and Paul Brady, June Tabor, Peter Bellamy and Spiers & Boden.

Led Zeppelin version
 
English band Led Zeppelin recorded the song for their album Led Zeppelin III in 1970. The album is a shift in style for the band towards acoustic material, influenced by a holiday Jimmy Page and Robert Plant took to the Bron-Yr-Aur cottage in the Welsh countryside. The liner notes include the songwriting credit "Traditional: Arranged by Page and Plant".

Page adapted the song from a version by American folk musician Fred Gerlach, which is included on his 1962 album Twelve-String Guitar for Folkways Records.

Composition

"Gallows Pole" begins as a simple acoustic guitar rhythm; mandolin is added in, then electric bass guitar shortly afterwards, and then banjo and drums simultaneously join in. The instrumentation builds up to a crescendo, increasing in tempo as the song progresses. The acoustic guitar chord progression (in standard tuning) is simple with a riff based on variations of the open A chord and the chords D and G occurring in the verse. Page played banjo, six and 12 string acoustic guitar and electric guitar (a Gibson Les Paul), while John Paul Jones played mandolin and bass.

Page has stated that, similar to the song "Battle of Evermore" that was included on their fourth album, the song emerged spontaneously when he started experimenting with Jones' banjo, an instrument he had never before played. "I just picked it up and started moving my fingers around until the chords sounded right, which is the same way I work on compositions when the guitar's in different tunings." It is also one of Page's favourite songs on Led Zeppelin III.

Led Zeppelin performed the song a few times live during Led Zeppelin concerts in 1971. Plant sometimes also included the lyrics in live performances of the Led Zeppelin song "Trampled Under Foot" in 1975.

Reception

In a retrospective review of Led Zeppelin III (Deluxe Edition), Kristofer Lenz of Consequence of Sound gave "Gallows Pole" a positive review, writing the track is "an excellent representation of Page’s acoustic prowess, as his simple guitar line is soon joined by 12-string and banjo." Lenz further wrote that Jones joins the fun as well, "as he adds some mandolin flourish to the mix."

Variations in other countries

Some 50 versions have been reported in Finland, where it is well known as "Lunastettava neito". It is titled "Den Bortsålda" in Sweden ( "Die Losgekaufte" in German). A Lithuanian version has the maid asking relatives to ransom her with their best animals or belongings (crown, house, crown, ring, sword, etc.). The maiden curses her relatives who refuse to give up their property and blesses her fiancé, who does ransom her.

In a Hungarian version called "Feher Anna", collected by Béla Bartók in his study The Hungarian Folk Song, Anna's brother László is imprisoned for stealing horses.  Anna sleeps with Judge Horváth to free him but is unsuccessful in sparing his life. She then regales the judge with 13 curses.

"Cecilia" is one of the best known and more diffused songs in the Italian popular music. With no reference to any curse, it tells a story not very different from those of "Feher Anna" and "Seven Curses". Cecilia's husband has been condemned to be hanged, and she asks the captain how it is possible to spare his life. The captain promise to save her husband if Cecilia sleeps with him, but in the morning Cecilia sees from the window her man has been hanged.

The song is also found in Northern Sami, titled Nieida Kajon sis, which tells a story that strongly resembles the Lithuanian version. The maid asks her relatives (father, mother, brother, sister, and uncle) to ransom her with their best belongings or animals (horse, cow, sword, crown, and ship).

Francis James Child describes additional examples from the Faroe Islands, Iceland, Russia, and Slovenia, several of which feature a man being ransomed by a woman.

The theme of delaying one's execution while awaiting rescue by relatives appears with a similar structure in the 1697 classic fairy tale "Bluebeard" by Charles Perrault (translated into English in 1729).

See also
 List of the Child Ballads
 The Child ballad "Geordie" also features a rescue from the gallows by a payment.
List of Led Zeppelin songs written or inspired by others

References

Further reading

Eleanor Long, "The Maid" and "The Hangman": Myth and Tradition in a Popular Ballad (University of California Press [Folklore Studies: 21], 1971, xiii+170 pp.) .
Eleanor Long, Child 95 "The maid freed from the gallows": a geographical-historical study. 1968.

Year of song unknown
Songwriter unknown
American folk songs
Lead Belly songs
Led Zeppelin songs
Peter, Paul and Mary songs
Songs written by Jimmy Page
Songs written by Robert Plant
Child Ballads
Song recordings produced by Jimmy Page
Atlantic Records singles